Urban Discipline is the second studio album by American heavy metal band Biohazard, released on November 10, 1992 by Roadrunner Records. The intro to the song "Punishment" is from the 1989 film The Punisher starring Dolph Lundgren. A remastered edition featuring bonus tracks was released in 2007.

Critical reception

In 2005, Urban Discipline was ranked number 277 in Rock Hard magazine's book of The 500 Greatest Rock & Metal Albums of All Time.

Track listing

Personnel

Biohazard

 Evan Seinfeld – lead vocals, bass
 Billy Graziadei – lead vocals, rhythm guitar
 Bobby Hambel – lead guitar, backing vocals
 Danny Schuler – drums

Additional personnel
Executive producer: Lyor Cohen
Produced by Wharton Tiers & Biohazard
Mixed by Steven Ett & Biohazard
Mastering: George Marino
Art director: Mitchell Trupia

Charts

References

Biohazard (band) albums
1992 albums
Roadrunner Records albums